Hanina Mizrahi (1886–1974) was an Iranian Jewish teacher, educator and public figure, who became known as the first author who wrote works about the folklore and customs of the Jews of Iran. Born in the capital Tehran in 1886, he was the son of Rabbi Hayyim Eleazar Mizrahi, the spiritual leader of the cities' Jewish community. Mizrahi and his family moved to Ottoman-held Palestine in 1895. He died in Jerusalem in 1974.

References

1886 births
1974 deaths
People from Tehran
Iranian Jews
Iranian emigrants to the Ottoman Empire
Israeli people of Iranian-Jewish descent
Iranian educators
20th-century Israeli educators
20th-century Iranian writers
20th-century Israeli writers
Jewish Israeli writers
Jewish educators
19th-century Jews
20th-century Israeli Jews
Hebrew-language writers